Mark Andrew Calibjo Hartmann (born 20 January 1992) is a professional footballer who plays as a forward or an attacking midfielder for Thai League 2 club Nakhon Si United and the Philippines national team.

Club career
As a youngster, Hartmann had stints with Portsmouth and then at Swindon Town where he was eventually released at the end of the 2009–10 season.

Blackfield and Langley
In 2010, he joined Wessex Football League side Blackfield & Langley. On 9 November 2010, he scored a hat-trick in a 4–2 win over Alresford Town.

Manila Nomads
After his stint with Blackfield & Langley, he moved to the Philippines where he joined Manila Nomads.

Loyola Meralco Sparks
In the 2010–11 United Football League mid-season transfer window, he joined Loyola Meralco Sparks and then scored his first goal in a 2–1 defeat to the Philippine Air Force. He scored a further seven goals in Loyola's final three games which included a hat-trick against the Philippine Navy, and a quadruple on the final day of the season in a 5–2 win.

On 15 October 2011, Hartmann scored five goals in a 15–1 win over newcomer Team Socceroo FC in the 2011–12 United Football Cup.

Global
From 2013 to 2016, he played with Global and scored the most goals in a single season after tallying 27 goals during the 2014 UFL season.

Geylang International
On 10 June 2016, Geylang International announced on their Facebook page that they have signed Hartmann from Global. Hartmann became the first Filipino to play in the S. League. He signed a short-term contract with Geylang that lasted until December 2016. He debuted in a match against Albirex Niigata (S) at the 2016 Singapore Cup on 1 July 2016. He made 8 goals for Geylang in 11 appearances. Geyland decided not to renew Hartmann's contract due to budgetary constraints and clubs from Thailand, Malaysia, and the Philippines has expressed interest to sign him.

Sarawak FA
He underwent trials at Sarawak in November 2016. By 16 December, Hartmann signed a season long contract with Sarawak. He scored his first goal for Sarawak against Kedah with a stunning free-kick. He scored hat trick against MISC-Mifa in Malaysia FA Cup.  He scored a total of seven goals from 15 appearances, three in the league and four in the Malaysia FA Cup. His contract was then terminated in May 2017.

Penang FA
After leaving Sarawak, Penang FA signed Hartmann as a free agent.

Ubon UMT United
After his spell at Malaysia, he joined Thai League 1 outfit Ubon UMT United. He scored his first goal for Ubon UMT United in a 3–1 away defeat against Nakhon Ratchasima. In early May, after making 14 appearances and scoring five goals, he was one of five players released by the club. He has joined Ratchaburi Mitr Phol FC after being released from Ubon UMT United, reported in a FOX Sports Asia article.

International career
In September 2011, he joined the national team training pool and was named in the final 20-man squad for the 2011 Long Teng Cup and the provisional Philippines under-23 squad for the 2011 Southeast Asian Games. In the Long Teng Cup, he made his full international debut in the 3–3 draw against Hong Kong.

He made his first appearance for the under-23 national team in the 3–1 loss against Vietnam in the opening match of the 2011 Southeast Asian Games.

He scored his first and second International Goal during the 2014 Philippine Peace Cup over Chinese Taipei.

On 12 October 2014, Hartmann scored a super hat-trick during the first half in a 5–0 victory over Papua New Guinea.

International goals
Scores and results list the Philippines' goal tally first.

Coaching career
Hartmann became the first coach of the women's team of the Manila Nomads known as the Nomads StretchMarks.

Honours
Global
United Football League: Winner 2014
United Football League: 2014 Golden Boot award

Personal life
He is the youngest among the brothers Darren Hartmann, who has played for the Philippine U-21's during the 2005 Hassanal Bolkiah Trophy, and Matthew Hartmann, who was a Philippines under-23 and senior international footballer.

References

External links

1992 births
Living people
Footballers from Southampton
English footballers
Citizens of the Philippines through descent
Filipino footballers
Philippines international footballers
Association football forwards
Association football midfielders
Malaysia Super League players
Singapore Premier League players
Mark Hartmann
English people of Filipino descent
British Asian footballers
Filipino British sportspeople
Expatriate footballers in Malaysia
Expatriate footballers in Singapore
Expatriate footballers in Thailand
Filipino expatriate sportspeople in Singapore
Filipino expatriate footballers
Portsmouth F.C. players
Swindon Town F.C. players
Blackfield & Langley F.C. players
Manila Nomads Sports Club players
F.C. Meralco Manila players
Global Makati F.C. players
Geylang International FC players
Sarawak FA players
Penang F.C. players
Mark Hartmann
Mark Hartmann
Mark Hartmann
Mark Hartmann
Ceres–Negros F.C. players
Wessex Football League players
Nakhon Si United F.C. players